The 2008–09 Taça da Liga was the second edition of the Taça da Liga, also known as Carlsberg Cup due to sponsorship reasons. The first matches were played on 2 August 2008 and the final was held on 21 March 2009 at the Estádio Algarve in Faro. Present for the second time in the final of this competition, Sporting CP were once again defeated 3–2 on penalties, this time by their rivals Benfica.

Format
After the first season, a change in the format was approved by the Portuguese League for Professional Football. The Cup began with a two-legged round between teams from Liga de Honra (2nd level). Winners were joined by the clubs classified 7th–14th from last season's Primeira Liga (1st level) plus two promoted to this season's Liga. There were six groups of three clubs each, and every team played two matches (once home and once away). Winners of the groups joined the top-six teams from the last season's Primeira Liga and there were three groups of four teams, each club playing three matches. Winners of the groups and the best second-placed club competed in the one-legged semi-finals, with the winners advancing to the final.

Participating clubs
This is a list of clubs participating in the 2008–09 Portuguese League Cup:
 Clubs starting from the first round: Boavista (excluded), União de Leiria, Vizela, Gil Vicente, Olhanense, Beira-Mar, Estoril, Desportivo das Aves, Varzim, Santa Clara, Portimonense, Gondomar, Freamunde, Feirense, UD Oliveirense, Sporting da Covilhã
 Clubs starting from the second round: Braga, Belenenses, Nacional, Naval, Académica, Estrela da Amadora, Leixões, Paços de Ferreira, Trofense, Rio Ave
 Clubs starting from the third round: Porto, Sporting CP, Vitória de Guimarães, Benfica, Marítimo, Vitória de Setúbal

First round
The matches were played on August 2 (first legs) and August 9 and 10, 2008 (second legs).

Second round
The matches were played from August 16 to November 5, 2008.

Group A

Group B

Group C

Group D

Group E

Group F

Third round
The matches were played from December 14, 2008 to January 18, 2009.

Group A

Group B

Group C

Knockout phase

Semi-finals
The semi-finals were held as one-legged matches with the two teams that had the highest number of points in the third round being given the home ground advantage. The draw was held at the LPFP headquarters on 20 January 2009, 12:30 UTC. The matches were played on 4 February 2009.

Final

References

External links
 Official page 

2008-09
2008–09 European domestic association football cups
2008–09 in Portuguese football